Alexander Alexandrovich Efimkin (born 2 December 1981 in Kuybyshev) is a Russian former professional road bicycle racer, who competed professionally between 2006 and 2012 for the , ,  and  teams. Efimkin has also worked as the directeur sportif of the  team in 2013, the RusVelo Women's Team in 2013 and the men's  team in 2014 and 2015.

The twin brother of Vladimir Efimkin, Alexander Efimkin burst on to the professional cycling scene in 2005 with a 2nd place overall at the Settimana Ciclistica Lombarda, a highly competitive race. Since that time he has proven a competent professional racer, with few victories to his name. In part this is owing to his service to the stars of his team, and in part due to his relatively young age.

Major results

2005
 1st Stage 3 Volta a Portugal
 2nd Overall Settimana Ciclistica Lombarda
2006
 2nd Road race, National Road Championships
 3rd Overall Volta ao Alentejo
2007
 1st  Overall Settimana Ciclistica Lombarda
1st Stage 3
 1st  Overall Giro del Capo
1st Stage 3
2008
 10th Overall Paris–Nice
2009
 3rd Paris–Camembert
2011
 1st  Overall Tour of Turkey

References

External links 

 

Palmares at Cycling Base

1981 births
Living people
Russian male cyclists
Sportspeople from Samara, Russia
Presidential Cycling Tour of Turkey winners